Robert Lovett may refer to:

 Robert A. Lovett (1895–1986), United States Secretary of Defense
 Robert Morss Lovett (1870–1956), American educator and writer; acting Governor of the United States Virgin Islands
 Robert Q. Lovett, film editor
 Robert S. Lovett (1860–1932), chairman of the Southern Pacific Company Executive Committee 1909–1913.
 Sir Robert Lovett (17th c.) of Liscombe in Buckinghamshire, England (see Lovett baronets)